The Choir is an atmospheric Christian alternative rock band currently comprising Derri Daugherty on guitar and vocals, Steve Hindalong on drums, and Dan Michaels on saxophone and lyricon.  Long-time bassist Tim Chandler died in 2018, and guitarist Marc Byrd was the fifth member of the band between 2005–2014.  As of 2023, the band has released 16 full-length studio albums, three EPs, five live albums, one single-disc compilation, one retrospective box set, and is still actively recording new material.

History

Southern California period (1983–1993)
The Choir was originally formed as Youth Choir in the early 1980s by Derri Daugherty and Steve Hindalong. Daniel Amos bass guitarist Tim Chandler introduced Hindalong to Daugherty, who was the band's roadie and sound man. Hindalong and Daugherty quickly became friends, and Youth Choir was part of the Calvary Chapel Christian punk and alternative music scene, which also included the bands Undercover, Crumbächer, Altar Boys and 4-4-1.

The band's first official recording was the track "It's So Wonderful", released in 1983 on the compilation album What's Shakin, which also included early work from Undercover, Altar Boys and The Lifters. This song was one of the few times that lead singer Derri Daugherty wrote both lyrics and music; as the band developed, the majority of the Choir's lyrical output would come from drummer/percussionist Steve Hindalong.  As Youth Choir, they released their debut album Voices in Shadows in 1985, with Mike Saurerbrey on bass; their first EP Shades of Gray followed a year later, when Dan Michaels joined the band.

The Choir made a high-profile move to Myrrh Records in 1986 with their next release, Diamonds and Rain. Dropping the "Youth" from their moniker, they would be known as the Choir from that point forward. This was followed by three more albums for Myrrh, which featured musical contributions from an array of Christian performers, including Charlie Peacock, Mark Heard, Steve Griffith of Vector and Gene Eugene and Riki Michele from Adam Again. The Choir's lineup also changed. Tim Chandler was the primary bass player until 1989's Wide-Eyed Wonder, as Robin Spurs replaced him on that album and tour, but she left the band during the recording of 1990's Circle Slide. Mike Sauerbrey returned to the band for these recording sessions, and remained with the Choir for two more years until Chandler rejoined the lineup for the independently-released Kissers and Killers. Sauerbrey would not play with the band again; Spurs would rejoin the Choir briefly in 2017, when she performed on the Wide-Eyed Wonder reunion tour.

The Choir toured extensively during this time, notably as the first band on stage at the inaugural Cornerstone Festival in Chicago in 1984. They also performed at the Greenbelt Festival in England in 1986, and opened for Russ Taff on his nationwide tour in 1989.  References to the band's tour experiences would remain an ongoing source of lyrical inspiration.  During their Southern California period, the Choir's music was described by the Los Angeles Times as "magical songs that combine strains of murky psychedelia with pure pop." Billboard praised the band for its "dark poetic leanings, effects-laden guitars and strong melodic hooks". Hindalong's lyrics became known for their vulnerability and honesty, particularly about the challenges inherent in romantic relationships and the simple joys of family life.

Initial Nashville period (1994–2009)
With much of the contemporary Christian music industry centered in Nashville, the band opted to make a permanent move there. Derri Daugherty and Steve Hindalong were both married with children, and the alternative Christian music scene in Southern California was no longer as active as it was in its mid-80s heyday. By contrast, the CCM industry had begun flourishing in Nashville in the early 1990s. The Choir's first release after arriving in Nashville was Speckled Bird, a reworked version of Kissers and Killers that added five additional songs recorded in Nashville. Their next album, Free Flying Soul, released in 1996, would bring the band their most notable industry accolades to that point, as they were awarded a GMA Dove Award for Best Modern/Alternative Rock Album. Five years later, they received a nomination for Best Rock Gospel Album at the 44th Annual Grammy Awards for their album, Flap Your Wings, released in 2000. Celebrating this, the Choir released a boxed set of their entire musical output called Never Say Never: The First 20 Years, which included a bonus CD of unreleased B-sides and remixes.

Upon their arrival in Nashville, Dan Michaels went into artist management, including managing the Choir, while Derri Daugherty and Steve Hindalong continued to contribute to and produce numerous side projects, including the Lost Dogs, and most notably, the City on a Hill worship music series. The lead song from the first album in that series, "God of Wonders," written by Hindalong and future Choir guitarist Marc Byrd, proved to be one of the most successful contemporary worship songs of the early 2000s, and the Choir has often performed that song live since. (That album also received a Dove Award for Special Event Album of the Year in 2001.) In 2005, the Choir officially added Byrd to their lineup and released O How the Mighty Have Fallen, produced by Byrd and released independently on the band's own Galaxy21 label. On August 19 of that same year, the Choir played the Broken Records Reunion, a 20th anniversary concert at Mariners Church in Irvine, California, along with 4-4-1, Altar Boys, Crumbächer, and Undercover.

Ongoing creative activity (2010–present)
After a five-year recording hiatus, the Choir released two full-length studio albums in 2010. In June, the band released Burning Like the Midnight Sun, which received positive reviews. Jeff Elbel, in the Chicago Sun-Times, called the album "a late-career triumph," and remarked that it was the band's "second exceptional album in a row, and its best since 1990's landmark Circle Slide." In November, the band released de-plumed which featured cellist Matt Slocum of Sixpence None the Richer. A collection of acoustic reinterpretations of one song from each of their 12 prior studio albums, it was released shortly after Daugherty and Hindalong embarked on a multi-city acoustic tour as a duo version of the band.

The Choir's next studio album, The Loudest Sound Ever Heard, was released in May 2012. Later that year, the band toured in celebration of the 25th anniversary of Chase the Kangaroo, playing the album in its entirety, followed by a selection of tracks from Loudest Sound. For this tour, the band performed as a trio with bassist Tim Chandler.  Then in July, the full lineup of the Choir closed out the final gathering of the Cornerstone Festival, in commemoration of their inaugural 1984 performance.

Shift to crowdfunding (2013)
From this point forward, the Choir would shift to Kickstarter and PledgeMusic as their primary way of recording and releasing new studio albums, re-releases of older studio albums, and solo work by Steve Hindalong and Derri Daugherty.  This process not only generated the studio releases Shadow Weaver in 2014, Bloodshot in 2018, and Deep Cuts in 2021, but Kickstarter stretch goals generated the Christmas-themed Peace, Love & Light EP in 2013 and the live album Live and on the Wing in Music City in 2014. During this time, the band remastered and re-released Circle Slide and Wide-Eyed Wonder, and followed each re-release with a short tour during which the entire album was played in its entirety.  Mike Roe of The 77s filled in on bass for the Circle Slide 25th anniversary tour in 2015, while bassist Robin Spurs returned to the band to perform on the Wide-Eyed Wonder anniversary tour in 2017. Hindalong's second solo album, The Warbler, was released in 2016, and this was followed by Daugherty's latest solo release The Color of Dreams in 2018.  Later that year, long-time bassist Tim Chandler died on October 8, 2018.  

Post-Tim Chandler work (2019-present)
Beginning in mid-2019, the band began releasing non-album singles at the pace of one every other month, starting with a cover of Phil Collins' "In the Air Tonight" and followed by "Mystical World", their first original composition after Chandler's death. In March of 2021, the Choir shifted to Patreon where they continue to release new tracks exclusively for subscribers, including a 2021 re-recording of "Render Love" for the Electric Jesus film soundtrack. Deep Cuts, also released in 2021, was the band's first studio album without contributions from Chandler, as bass duties were split between session player Chris Donohue and bassist Steven Mason from Jars of Clay.

Other projects
Each band member has worked on numerous projects outside the Choir. 

Derri Daugherty and Steve Hindalong have produced and recorded several worship albums featuring other Contemporary Christian music artists, including their own At the Foot of the Cross series. Volume One: Clouds, Rain, Fire was released in 1992, and the song "Beautiful Scandalous Night" would later be re-recorded by the Choir eight years later for their Grammy-nominated Flap Your Wings album. The follow-up Volume Two: Seven Last Words of Christ was released in 1995. Hindalong would later produce the successful City on a Hill series of worship albums in the early 2000s, co-writing the well-known song "God of Wonders" with former bandmate Marc Byrd. 

Daugherty, Hindalong and Dan Michaels have all released solo works, with Daugherty also releasing an instrumental ambient project under the name Clouds Echo in Blue. Daugherty has been a member of the contemporary Christian supergroup Lost Dogs since 1991, with Hindalong joining the group after the death of Gene Eugene. Daugherty is one-half of Kerosene Halo, a duo project with 77's frontman Michael Roe; they have released three albums to date. Before his death in 2018, Tim Chandler was the bass guitar player for Daniel Amos (and that band's side project, the Swirling Eddies) for many years, pre-dating his work with the Choir. Bassist Robin Spurs later joined Rachel Rachel and toured with them in the early 1990s. Byrd was a member of Common Children, then later he and bandmate Andrew Thompson formed the post-rock band Hammock in 2005. Byrd has also recorded with his wife Christine Glass as Glassbyrd. Michaels has recorded saxophone for, and performed on tour with, a variety of other artists including Adam Again, Crystal Lewis and Bryan Duncan.
PersonnelCurrent members Derri Daugherty - lead vocals, guitars
 Steve Hindalong - drums, percussion, vocals
 Dan Michaels - saxophone, lyriconFormer members Mike Sauerbrey - bass guitar
 Robin Spurs - bass guitar, vocals
 Marc Byrd - guitars, vocals
 Tim Chandler - bass guitar, vocalsTouring musicians''' Conant, Palmer (2001), p. 31.
 Billy Sammons (nee "Billy Wilde") - guitar
 Bill Campbell - guitar
 Wayne Everett - percussion
 Michael Roe - bass guitar, vocals

Discography
Studio albums
 1985 Voices in Shadows (as Youth Choir)
 1986 Diamonds and Rain 1988 Chase the Kangaroo 1989 Wide-Eyed Wonder 1990 Circle Slide 1993 Kissers and Killers 1994 Speckled Bird 1996 Free Flying Soul 2000 Flap Your Wings 2005 O How the Mighty Have Fallen 2010 Burning Like the Midnight Sun 2010 de-plumed 2012 The Loudest Sound Ever Heard 2014 Shadow Weaver 2018 Bloodshot 2021 Deep CutsEPs
 1986 Shades of Gray (as Youth Choir)
 2005 3-Song "Rough Mix" New Song Sampler 2013 Peace, Love & LightLive albums
 1997 Let It Fly 2000 Live at Cornerstone 2000: Plugged 2000 Live at Cornerstone 2000: Unplugged 2014 Live and on the Wing in Music City 2015 The Livestream BootlegCompilations
 1995 Love Songs and Prayers: A Retrospective 2001 Never Say Never: The First 20 YearsNon-album tracks
Singles
 1985 "I Can't Take It" b/w "Here in the Night (live)" (7-inch single; as Youth Choir)

Digital singles
 2004 "Travelin' Light (demo)" (music download)
 2006 "The Sun Also Rises (demo)" (streaming)
 2010 "Babe in the Straw" (music download)
 2012 "Shadow of the Cross" (music download)
 2013 "Beautiful Girl" (music download)
 2016 "Rhythm of the Road (Reimagined)" (music download)
 2019 "In the Air Tonight" (music download)
 2019 "After All (Reimagined) [featuring Leigh Nash]" (music download)
 2019 "Mystical World" (music download)
 2019 "Kathie's Garden" (music download)
 2019 "Counting Stars" (music download)
 2020 "What You Think I Am (Reimagined) [featuring Leigh Nash]" (music download)
 2020 "The Real WWW" (music download)

Patreon-exclusive music downloads
All songs initially released to Patreon supporters only. In 2023, the Choir began making some of these tracks more widely available under the banner The Patreon Sessions, either by individual download or on streaming platforms. Tracks later made available outside of Patreon are indicated.
 2021 "Render Love (2021 Version)"
 2021 "Alone"
 2021 "My Father's Son"
 2021 "One Man Band"
 2021 "Let It Ride" (Facebook)
 2021 "Wings on Fire"
 2021 "Angry World"
 2021 "Old Man Winter"
 2022 "Just Who" (The Patreon Sessions music download; streaming)
 2022 "Billy Wilde"
 2022 "Talk It Out" (The Patreon Sessions music download; streaming)
 2022 "Something in the Way She Moves"
 2022 "I Don't Wanna Cry"
 2022 "Centrifugal" (The Patreon Sessions music download; streaming)
 2022 "Sentimental Song (Reimagined)" (Facebook)
 2022 "Snow Angels and Holiday Prayers" (music download; streaming)
 2022 "Be My Girl"
 2022 "We Drive On" (The Patreon Sessions music download; streaming)
 2022 "Mind Your Ways"
 2022 "Summon Your Soul"
 2022 "A Matter of Degrees"
 2023 "Heaven"

Appearances on other works
 1983 What's Shakin ["It's So Wonderful"] (as Youth Choir)
 1985 Broken Samples ["Here in the Night"] (as Youth Choir)
 1989 The Myrrh Radio Collection, Volume 1 ["Someone to Hold Onto"]
 1993 Brow Beat: Unplugged Alternative  ["Wilderness" (acoustic version)]
 1993 Third Wave  ["Kissers and Killers"]
 1994 Can You Dig It?  ["Kissers and Killers"]
 1994 Strong Hand of Love  ["Tip of My Tongue"]
 1995 Contemporary Adult Music for the 90's ["Wilderness"]
 1996 Orphans of God  ["Tip of My Tongue"]
 1996 Seltzer: Modern Rock to Settle Your Soul ["The Ocean"]
 1998 Grab Bag Candy Sampler, Volume 1 ["Flowing Over Me" (demo version)]
 2003 Contemporary Christian Hits: A Collage ["Grace"]
 2022 There's a Rainbow Somewhere: The Songs of Randy Stonehill ["The Last Time I Saw Eden"]

Video appearances
 1989 Wide-Eyed Wonder Videos (music videos for "Someone To Hold Onto" and "Robin Had A Dream"; 32-minute band documentary)
 1996 "Sled Dog" music video (included on enhanced CD for Let It Fly) 
 1996 Tattoo Video Hoopla (live performance from Cornerstone '96)

Solo releases by members of the Choir
 1991 Reveal [EP] – Dan Michaels
 1998 Skinny – Steve Hindalong
 2002 A Few Unfinished Songs [EP] – Derri Daugherty
 2003 Open Wide This Window – Glassbyrd (Marc Byrd and Christine Glass)
 2010 "I Still Believe" [Single] - Derri Daugherty
 2011 Clouds Echo in Blue – Clouds Echo in Blue (Derri Daugherty)
 2015 "Child in the Manger" [Single] - Derri Daugherty
 2016 The Warbler – Steve Hindalong
 2016 Hush Sorrow – Derri Daugherty
 2018 The Color of Dreams – Derri Daugherty

ReferencesFootnotesBibliography'''

External links
 
 
 
 
 

Musical groups from Nashville, Tennessee
American Christian rock groups
Musical groups established in 1984
Myrrh Records artists